Anbe Vaa is a 2005 Indian Tamil-language romance film directed by K. Selva Bharathy. The film stars newcomer Thendral, Sridevika and Vivek, with M. S. Viswanathan, M. N. Rajam, Rekha, K. Deepa Arunachalam and C. Duraipandian playing supporting roles. It was released on 18 November 2005 to mixed reviews. This film was Vivek's 150th film.

Plot  
In Chennai, Karthik (Thendral) is a carefree art college student who spends his time drinking and enjoying time with his friends and his talkative uncle Nandha (Vivek). Karthik is the son of a rich heiress (Rekha). After finishing his studies, his mother urges him to marry someone or work in their company, but Karthik leaves his home and takes Nandha with him. Unable to find a place to stay, they return home. Karthik, who wants to avoid the responsibility of a job, accepts for an arranged marriage. In Madurai, Priya (Sridevika) has finished her studies and returns to her native village. She also accepts for an arranged marriage to escape from her dead-end life in a small village. Karthik and his family come to the village to see the potential bride Priya. Karthik and Priya fall in love at first sight, accept to get married, and they marry with the blessings of their families. After the marriage, Nandha tells Priya that Karthik is heavily dependent on him and stubborn and asks her to take care of him from now on. Whereas Priya's family takes promises from Nandha to not make her cry or else they would teach him a lesson.

Karthik and Priya move in a flat in Chennai. The young couple decides to have enough space and privacy in their relationship, but Karthik's mother urges Priya to be more intrusive towards Karthik. Priya, being a disciplined person, is bothered by Karthik's carelessness. In one week, a dispute arises between the two as they find that they are not compatible. They split up, and Priya returns to her village.

Nandha then convinces Priya to come back home and tries his best to unite the young couple. Priya decides to seduce her husband in different ways. She tries to capitalize on her glamour and her culinary skills, but both her attempts fail miserably. Priya and Karthik then start to annoy each other. One day, things get out of control, and a furious Karthik threatens Priya with a knife, and she calls the police. The police arrests Karthik, and Nandha tries to change Priya's mind, but she slaps him. After this incident, Karthik applies for a divorce. In an attempt to save their marriage, Nandha sends the couple attending marriage counselling sessions, but they are hell-bent on getting a divorce. Priya's family has to resort to the rowdy Gaja (Karate Raja) to speed up the divorce process. At the 60th wedding anniversary of Priya's grandparents (M. S. Viswanathan and M. N. Rajam), the old couple and Nandha have an emotional speech changing Priya's negative thoughts about marriage, and she begs her grandparents for forgiveness for hurting their feelings. Gaja, who falls in love with Priya, kidnaps her, and Nandha urges Karthik to save her. During the fight, Nandha is stabbed by a henchman and is later saved at the hospital. Karthik too feels bad for hurting his family's feelings. The couple puts their egos aside and decides to unite for the benefit of all.

Cast 

 Thendral as Karthik
 Sridevika as Priya
 Vivek as Nandha
 M. S. Viswanathan as Priya's grandfather
 M. N. Rajam as Rajam, Priya's grandmother
 Rekha as Karthik's mother
 K. Deepa Arunachalam as Ramasamy
 C. Duraipandian as Priya's father
 Karate Raja as Gaja
 Manobala as Counsellor
 LIC Narasimhan as Flat President
 Cell Murugan as Man with love letters
 Chaams as House Owner
 Sivanarayanamoorthy as House Owner
 Selvakumar as House Owner
 Periya Karuppu Thevar as Villager
 Chelladurai as Villager
 Jinda as Villager
 Julie as Priya's relative
 Kovai Senthil
 Arulrasan
 Nagendran
 Girija
 K. Devi
 Siva
 Sathyandran
 Ambani Shankar as Young Nandha
 Risha in a special appearance

Soundtrack 

The soundtrack was composed by D. Imman.

Reception 
Sify wrote, "Anbe Vaa depends largely on Vivek’s scintillating comedy show. His antics spice up the proceedings and the punch lines make you smile. Sreedevika is not bad for a first-timer. The film drags towards the end and music of D.Imman is a big let down. On the whole, this Selvabharathy directed film is funny in parts thanks to the one-man laugh brigade called Vivek." Balaji Balasubramaniam wrote, "Anbe Vaa is one of those movies that benefits from low expectations. The mug of its debutant hero doesn't inspire much confidence and its only Vivek's name on the credits that gives the film some credibility. But the movie avoids the easy route(of setting the movie in a college and loading the movie with vulgarity) that most movies with newcomers take and aims higher. It doesn't reach that high in the end but the effort deserves some credit."

References 

2005 films
2000s Tamil-language films
Films directed by K. Selva Bharathy